The Vainakh (also spelled Veinakh) languages are a dialect continuum that consists of the Chechen and Ingush languages, spoken mainly in the Russian republics of Chechnya and Ingushetia, as well as in the Chechen diaspora. Together with Bats, they form the Nakh branch of the Northeast Caucasian languages family.

See also 
 Languages of the Caucasus
 Northeast Caucasian languages

References

Northeast Caucasian languages